Joel Valentino Grant (born 26 August 1987) is a professional footballer who plays as a winger for Nantwich Town.

Beginning his career with Watford he made seven league appearances as well as spending time on loan with Aldershot Town, he later played for Crewe Alexandra, Wycombe Wanderers, Yeovil Town, Exeter City, Plymouth Argyle, Swindon Town and Grimsby Town. He is a former Jamaican international. He can either play as a winger, midfielder or striker. He has performed as a traditional winger for most of his career, despite the rise of inside forwards in the past decade.

Club career

Watford
Born in Acton, London, Grant started his career at Watford. He made his first team debut whilst still a member of Watford's Academy, coming on as a substitute in a League Cup match against Notts County on 23 August 2005. Whilst still an Academy scholar, he made nine more appearances for the club, including three starts.

Grant was rewarded with a professional contract by Watford prior to the 2006–07 season. On 31 August 2006, he joined Aldershot Town on a four-month loan, to gain experience. During his time with the Shots, he made 19 league and cup appearances, scoring 4 goals.

Grant was unable to break into the Watford side during their 2006–07 Premiership campaign and he was released at the end of the season.

Aldershot Town
In September 2007 he rejoined Aldershot Town on non-contract terms. In December 2007 he signed a contract until the end of the season. He made 30 league appearances, scoring four times, as Aldershot Town were promoted from the Conference.

Crewe Alexandra
On 25 June 2008, Grant joined Crewe Alexandra for £130,000, signing a three-year contract. The fee represented a club record sale for Aldershot Town. Grant scored his first goal for Crewe with a marvellous run and step over in the 2–1 win over Walsall at Gresty Road. The goal was shown as the Big Skill on Big League Weekend 2 on Sky Sports due to the step over. In 2009–10, Grant had a productive second season at Crewe, contributing nine goals and several assists marshalling the left wing.

He was released from the club in May 2011, having been limited to 28 appearances in the 2010–11 campaign.

Wycombe Wanderers
Grant signed for Wycombe Wanderers on 27 May 2011 on a free transfer.

Yeovil Town
Grant signed a two-year deal with Championship side Yeovil Town on 26 June 2013. Grant made his debut for Yeovil in their Football League Cup first round victory over Southend United, on 6 August 2013.

Grant was released at the end of the 2014–15 season following Yeovil's relegation to League Two.

Exeter City
On 21 August 2015, Grant joined Exeter City as the 1931 fan-funded player.

Plymouth Argyle
At the end of the 2016–17 season, Grant turned down the offer of a new contract with Exeter, to sign for their Devon rivals Plymouth Argyle.
Grant operated as a traditional winger for most of his first season in the team. With manager Derek Adams opting for 4-2-3-1 and 4-3-3 formations for the first half of the 2017–18 season, Grant featured heavily but, once Adams switched to 4-3-2-1 and deployed Graham Carey and Ruben Lameiras as inside forwards, Grant lost favour and was only involved as a defensive substitute or a backup striker. To counteract this, he evolved tactically in the following 2018–19 season and began to exhibit traits more associated with inside forwards than traditional wingers. Consequently, the rates at which he completed dribbles, created chances and scored goals increased.

He was offered a new contract by Plymouth Argyle at the end of the 2018–19 season. He signed a new contract in June 2019. In October 2019 he scored in his third game in a row, and was praised by manager Ryan Lowe.

Swindon Town
On 19 September 2020, Grant joined Swindon Town on a one-year deal following a successful trial  On 14 May 2021, it was announced that he would leave Swindon at the end of the season, following the expiry of his contract.

Grimsby Town
In July 2021, Grant joined National League side Grimsby Town following his release from Swindon.

Following an injury setback, Grant eventually made his debut on 6 November 2021 in an FA Cup tie away at Kidderminster Harriers.

On 16 February 2022, manager Paul Hurst commented that Grant was available for loan following a difficult period blighted by injury. "There hasn't been any interest, I am surprised when there is an experienced player with his record, prior to this season. At the minute, the phone has been quiet on that one. I think the injuries have been a major part of it (his struggles). He has been training for a couple of months but when he came in he wasn't up to speed. He had a setback and from then it's been a struggle really. Sometimes things that look good don't work out. You have to say, if we're being honest, that's how it looks as we speak. That's one that hasn't gone to plan."

On 8 April 2022, Grant was released by mutual consent, he had only made two substitute appearances for The Mariners during the season.

Nantwich Town
Ahead of the 2022–23 season, Grant signed for non-league team Nantwich Town, scoring on his debut in a friendly against Wrexham.

International career
In June 2006 Grant earned a call-up to the Jamaica under-23 squad to play in the Central American and Caribbean Games taking place in Colombia between 15 and 29 July. He spent much of February 2007 with the squad for the CONCACAF under-20 World Cup qualifiers.

In May 2014 Grant was called up to the Jamaica senior squad, and made his full international début playing for 78 minutes against Serbia on 26 May. He scored his first goal at the senior level in a 2–2 draw with Egypt on 4 June 2014 at Leyton, England.

On 2 June 2016, Grant was called up to the Jamaica squad for the Copa América Centenario as a replacement for the injured Simon Dawkins.

Career statistics

Club

International

International goals
As of match played 27 May 2016. Jamaica score listed first, score column indicates score after each Grant goal.

Honours
Aldershot Town
Conference Premier: 2008
Conference League Cup: 2008

Jamaica
Caribbean Cup: 2014

References

External links
Joel Grant player profile at crewealex.net

1987 births
Living people
Footballers from Acton, London
English footballers
English people of Jamaican descent
Black British sportsmen
Jamaican footballers
Jamaica international footballers
Exeter City F.C. players
Watford F.C. players
Aldershot Town F.C. players
Wycombe Wanderers F.C. players
Yeovil Town F.C. players
Crewe Alexandra F.C. players
Plymouth Argyle F.C. players
Swindon Town F.C. players
Grimsby Town F.C. players
Nantwich Town F.C. players
English Football League players
National League (English football) players
2014 Caribbean Cup players
2015 Copa América players
2015 CONCACAF Gold Cup players
Copa América Centenario players
Association football wingers
Association football forwards